The Lebanese Second Division is the second division of Lebanese football. It is controlled by the Lebanese Football Association. The top two teams qualify for the Lebanese Premier League and replace the relegated teams, while the bottom two are relegated to the Lebanese Third Division.

Sporting and Ansar Howara were promoted from the Third Division, while Bekaa and Racing Beirut were relegated from the Lebanese Premier League in 2018–19.

On 21 January 2020, the LFA decided to suspend all football leagues until further notice, and cancelled the three match days that were previously played (the last one being on 17 October 2019). The season was officially cancelled on 28 May 2020.

Teams

League table prior to the suspension

References 

2019–20 in Lebanese football
Lebanese Second Division seasons
2019–20 in Asian second tier association football leagues
Lebanese Second Division